Nick Kimpton (born 27 October 1983) is an Australian former baseball player.

In 2004, he was part of the Australian Olympic baseball team who achieved a silver medal in the baseball tournament at the Athens Olympics.

He signed with the Anaheim Angels in 2001.

In 2009, he returned to international competition, when he was selected for Australia at the 2009 Baseball World Cup.

Kimpton last played for the Canberra Cavalry in the Australian Baseball League's inaugural 2010-11 season where he hit .234 in 34 games. as did Chris Kimpton.

References

External links

1983 births
Living people
Arizona League Angels players
Australian expatriate baseball players in the United States
Baseball outfielders
Baseball players at the 2004 Summer Olympics
Canberra Cavalry players
Cedar Rapids Kernels players
Medalists at the 2004 Summer Olympics
Olympic baseball players of Australia
Olympic silver medalists for Australia
Olympic medalists in baseball
Rancho Cucamonga Quakes players